James Neale Hanvey (born 28 December 1964) is a Scottish politician serving as the Leader of the  Alba Party in the  House of Commons since 2021, and the  Member of Parliament (MP) for Kirkcaldy and Cowdenbeath since 2019. Formerly a member of the Scottish National Party (SNP), he defected from the SNP to the Alba Party in March 2021. He was the SNP member and spokesperson for the Health and Social Care Select Committee and he was briefly Shadow Minister for COVID Vaccine Deployment.

Early life and career
Born in Belfast, Hanvey was the son of James Stafford Hanvey and Mary Isobel (Ismay) Hanvey (née Withers). He was educated at Glenrothes High School before starting a twenty-five year career in the National Health Service. In 2005, he was appointed as divisional nurse director for rare cancer at the Royal Marsden Hospital. He has been a contributing author to medical textbooks.

Political career
After returning to Scotland in 2012, Hanvey was elected as a Scottish National Party councillor in the 2012 Scottish local elections for the Dunfermline Central ward in Fife. During his time as a councillor, Hanvey was the SNP spokesperson for health and social care, SNP group convener, and latterly SNP group leader in 2017, but lost his seat at the 2017 local elections. In October 2019, he was selected as the SNP candidate for the Kirkcaldy and Cowdenbeath constituency at the 2019 general election.

Suspension and re-admission to the SNP 
In November 2019, he was suspended from the party following allegations that he made antisemitic social media posts two years earlier, in which he compared Israel's treatment of the Palestinians to the treatment of Jews during the Second World War and shared a newspaper article that included an image of George Soros that drew on an antisemitic trope. As a result, the SNP withdrew support for his campaign, but he remained as the party candidate on the ballot paper because the 14 November 2019 deadline for nominations had already passed. Hanvey accepted the suspension and apologised for the offending posts, stating that he was "genuinely and deeply sorry" and that "Although I do not in anyway consider myself anti-Semitic, on reflection the language I used was, and this is clearly unacceptable."

Hanvey was elected as MP for Kirkcaldy and Cowdenbeath at the 2019 general election, gaining the seat from the Labour Party's shadow Scottish secretary Lesley Laird by a majority of 1,243 votes. He sat as an independent MP upon his election.

During his suspension from the SNP, Hanvey was advised by the Antisemitism Policy Trust (APT) and attended several APT activities in Parliament. He also appeared before the Scottish Council of Jewish Communities to apologise in person and thank them for their "generosity of spirit and willingness to help" during this time.

In March 2020, the SNP's conduct committee agreed that Hanvey should be readmitted to the party in May 2020. The SNP released a statement on 2 June to confirm that Hanvey's six-month suspension from the party had ended on 27 May and that he would now join the SNP Westminster Group to sit as an SNP MP.

On 2 July 2020 it was announced that Hanvey had been appointed as the SNP member and spokesperson for the Westminster Health and Social Care Select Committee. In November 2020, a year after his suspension, Hanvey was elected to the SNP's Member Conduct Committee.

In February 2021, Hanvey lost his role as the SNP's vaccine spokesperson after refusing to apologise for publicly backing a crowdfunding campaign for a defamation case against several individuals, including SNP MP Kirsty Blackman.

Exit from the SNP 
In March 2021, Hanvey left the SNP to join the newly formed Alba Party and then stood as a candidate in the Mid Scotland and Fife region in the 2021 Scottish Parliament election. Neither he nor his party succeeded in gaining a seat.

In August 2021 he spoke of concerns that he was being spied on by a political party. Later that month, he faced criticism for using the situation in Afghanistan to attack Ian Blackford, talking of trans rights in a tweet saying "Not to diminish the extant horrors in Afghanistan for women, girls and LGBT people in any way, but Ian Blackford opining on protecting women and girls is a tough listen given the deaf ears to such concerns at home.", which Hanvey promptly deleted.

On 13 July 2022, Speaker Lindsay Hoyle ejected Hanvey and his Alba colleague Kenny MacAskill (East Lothian) from the House of Commons for disrupting the start of Prime Minister's Questions. The two had been protesting about the refusal to grant consent for a second independence referendum. As both Members were named by the Speaker, by convention MacAskill and Hanvey were handed five day suspensions from the House.

Views 

Hanvey has signed the Women's Pledge, which originated amongst members of the SNP. The pledge opposes the Scottish Government's proposed reforms to the Gender Recognition Act (GRA) in Scotland which would allow transgender people to obtain a Gender Recognition Certificate on the basis of a statutory self-declaration, rather than the existing Gender Recognition Panel which require the involvement of a medical expert. He later claimed he was personally targeted for doing so.

In April 2021, Hanvey shared an article falsely claiming the SNP were channelling public funding to organisations campaigning to lower the age of consent to 10. The SNP described these claims as "deeply homophobic and untrue", and were also condemned by Scottish Greens co-leader Patrick Harvie.

Hanvey has called for an end to arms sales to Saudi Arabia from Scottish weapons manufacturers due to the Saudi atrocities in Yemen.

Personal life 
Hanvey is one of 45 openly LGBT MPs. He lives in Fife with his partner, Avelino del Carmen Prado Cortes, and two sons. The couple have been together since 1994, and entered into a civil partnership in 2011.

He lists his recreations as "composing electronic music (have previously released material under the name 'Security Blue'), swimming, music, film".

References

External links

Living people
UK MPs 2019–present
1964 births
Scottish National Party MPs
Scottish LGBT politicians
LGBT members of the Parliament of the United Kingdom
Members of the Parliament of the United Kingdom for Fife constituencies
Independent members of the House of Commons of the United Kingdom
Scottish National Party councillors
Gay politicians
Politicians from Belfast
People educated at Glenrothes High School
Councillors in Fife
Alba Party MPs
Politicians affected by a party expulsion process